The Ohio Department of Administrative Services (DAS) is the administrative department of the Ohio state government responsible for such disparate matters as personnel, government procurement, public printing, and facilities, telecommunications and fleet management.

References

External links
Official website

Administrative Services